The 1st constituency of the Tarn (French: Première circonscription du Tarn) is a French legislative constituency in the Tarn département. Like the other 576 French constituencies, it elects one MP using the two-round system, with a run-off if no candidate receives over 50% of the vote in the first round.

Description

The 1st constituency of Tarn lies in the east of the constituency and includes some of Albi, which it shares with Tarn's 2nd constituency.

After many years of electing centre left PS deputies the seat swung to the right at the 2012 electing Philippe Folliot of the small Centrist Alliance party.

Assembly Members

Election results

2022

 
 
 
 
 
 
 
 
 
 
 
|-
| colspan="8" bgcolor="#E9E9E9"|
|-
 
 

 
 
 
 
 

* PS dissident** LREM dissident

2017

 
 
 
 
 
 
 
 
|-
| colspan="8" bgcolor="#E9E9E9"|
|-

2012

 
 
 
 
 
 
|-
| colspan="8" bgcolor="#E9E9E9"|
|-

2007

 
 
 
 
 
 
 
|-
| colspan="8" bgcolor="#E9E9E9"|
|-

2002

 
 
 
 
 
 
 
 
|-
| colspan="8" bgcolor="#E9E9E9"|
|-

1997

 
 
 
 
 
 
|-
| colspan="8" bgcolor="#E9E9E9"|
|-

References

1